Žeimiai Eldership is a Lithuanian eldership, located in a northern part of Jonava District Municipality. As of 2020, administrative centre and largest settlement within eldership was Žeimiai.

Populated places 
Following settlements are located in the Žeimiai Eldership (as for 2011 census):

 Towns: Žeimiai
 Villages: Akliai, Akmeniai, Barsukinė, Biliuškiai, Blauzdžiai, Drobiškiai, Gireliai, Jagėlava, Juljanava, Juškonys, Kuigaliai, Liepkalnis, Martyniškis, Milašiškiai, Mimaliai, Mitėniškiai, Naujasodis, Naujokai, Normainėliai, Normainiai, Normainiai II, Paduobiai, Palankesiai, Pamelnytėlė, Pauliukai, Pročkai, Pėdžiai, Skrynės, Svalkeniai, Terespolis, Varpėnai, Zofijauka, Žieveliškiai
 Railway settlements: Žeimiai GS

Demography

References

Elderships in Jonava District Municipality